For Better or Worse is an American comedy-drama series created and produced by playwright/director/producer Tyler Perry. The series is based on Perry's 2007 film Why Did I Get Married? and its 2010 sequel Why Did I Get Married Too? It premiered on TBS on November 25, 2011. Led by the comical, over-the-top antics of Marcus and Angela Williams, the ensemble follows three couples: Marcus and Angela, Joseph and Leslie, and Richard and Keisha, who are at various stages of their relationships, as they go through the ups-and-downs of married life and dating.

On February 20, 2013  it was announced that TBS had opted not to renew the series, and that the Oprah Winfrey Network had since ordered a third season as part of a new deal the network made with Perry.

After leaving TBS, OWN had aired episodes of For Better or Worse from 2013–2017

Series overview

Episodes

Season 1 (2011)

Season 2 (2012)

Season 3 (2013–14)
During the third season, the show runs on OWN until 2017, when the show ended.

Season 4 (2015)

Season 5 (2016)

Season 6 (2017)

References

Lists of American sitcom episodes